Samson H. Rausuk (1793 – 11 September 1877) was a Lithuanian-British librarian, Hebraist, Talmudic scholar, and poet. He was regarded as the 'poet laureate' of the London Jewish community for nearly thirty years.

Biography
Rausuk was born in Vilkovishk, Lithuania, where he received a traditional Litvak yeshiva education, and pursued a career as a merchant. On the occasion of the visit of Sir Moses Montefiore to Russia in 1846, Rausuk was one of the delegates appointed to receive him. He moved to London in 1848, and held the post of librarian to the Leadenhall Street Beth Hamedrash for nearly a quarter of a century.

During this time, he published many of his Hebrew compositions, often dealing with subjects of passing interest to the local community, and contributed to the Jewish Chronicle. Among Rausuk's poems were odes to Montefiore in commemoration of his missions to Romania and Morocco. He also contributed to a volume of translations of Martin Farquhar Tupper's A Hymn for All Nations, other contributors to which included William Hodge Mill, Thomas Robinson, W. Burckhardt Barker, Benjamin Hall Kennedy, Richard Shilleto, Rowland Williams, W. Gifford Cookesley, Morris Williams, John O'Donovan, Thomas McLauchlan, George Métivier, Gabriele Rossetti, and Kah-Ge-Ga-Gah-Bowh.

Publications

References

Footnotes

1793 births
1877 deaths
19th-century Lithuanian Jews
19th-century English poets
British Hebraists
English Jewish writers
Hebrew-language poets
Librarians from London
People of the Haskalah
People from Vilkaviškis
Rabbis from London
Writers from London
Lithuanian emigrants to the United Kingdom